BTNHResurrection is the fourth studio album by hip hop group Bone Thugs-n-Harmony. The album was released on February 29, 2000 on Ruthless. It reached Platinum status within a month, but sales declined afterwards. Flesh-n-Bone was heavily featured on this album, appearing in 14 of the 15 tracks (not including the bonus track) which was rarely seen on previous albums due to him not being signed to Ruthless with the rest of the group. This was Flesh-n-Bone's last appearance on a Bone Thugs-n-Harmony album for 10 years because he was convicted for assault with a firearm and criminal possession of a weapon in June 2000. Pleading guilty, he was sentenced to 11 years in prison, and was released in July 2008, re-appearing on the group's album Uni5: The World's Enemy in 2010.

Track listing
Credits adapted from the album's liner notes.

Appearances
 Bizzy Bone appears on all tracks. 
 Layzie Bone appears on 15 tracks. 
 Flesh-n-Bone appears on 14 tracks. 
 Krayzie Bone appears on 10 tracks.
 Wish Bone appears on 8 tracks.

Sample credits
 "Don't Worry" contains an interpolation from "So In Love With You", written by Michael Hawkins and Leroy Hutson.

Music videos
 "Resurrection (Paper, Paper)"
 "Change The World"
 "Can't Give It Up"
 "Weed Song"

Charts

Weekly charts

Year-end charts

Certifications

References

Ruthless Records albums
Bone Thugs-n-Harmony albums
2000 albums
Albums produced by L.T. Hutton